Daniel Roemer is a Los Angeles-based American film director, actor, and screenwriter.  He studied film and theater at University of Southern California.

Active projects
Daniel is currently in development on the feature film Treatment, a psychological thriller being produced by Christina Lee and Allison Calleri (20th Century Fox). 
He's also in post-production on feature doc, Red White and Blowhard (DFC Films - 2015) starring cult celebrities "Naked Cowboy" (Leno/Letterman) and Danny McDermott (The View).

Recognition
 Two season Project Greenlight Finalist (Producers Ben Affleck/Matt Damon)
 Student Academy Award Finalist
 USA Film's top 10 Emerging Director's List
 On The Lot finalist (producer Steven Spielberg)
 LA Film Fest "DNA Award" (Universal Films Million Dollar Feature Deal)
 Hannah Rosin article (Washington Post).

Screenings
 Sundance Film Festival
 Damah Film Festival
 AFI Fest
 LA Shorts Fest
 Special United States Senate screening in Washington, D.C.
 Theatrical distribution (75 countries).
 National screenings with 20th Century Fox producer, Ralph Winter (X-Men 1 & 2, and X-Men: The Last Stand).

Filmography

Director
 Red White and Blowhard (DFC Films - 2015) feature documentary
 (CW Network) (2014) - TV Pilot
  (Sportsman Channel) (2011) national commercials
  GRAY (2010) feature docu-drama (Delaware Film Company)
  Loneliness of One National TV (2009) "World's Funniest Moments - Arsenio Hall 
   I Love Your Work (2005) (Sony Pictures) Behind the Scenes: Giovanni Ribisi, Jason Lee, Vince Vaughn, Christina Ricci, Elvis Costello
 Huckleberry Fund (2005), Ben Stiller interview
 The Select Fit (2004)
 Charity promos (2004) John Travolta, Kelly Preston, Meryl Streep, Olivia Newton-John, John Ritter, Pierce Brosnan,  Selma Blair
 Cigarette (2003)
 Access Hollywood (2003) director/editor
 E! (2002) director
 American Wet Dream (2001)

Editor
 Entertainment Tonight (Active)
 Access Hollywood (Active)
 Dr Phil Highlight Editor (2008)
 The View (2007)
 Dumpster Diving (2006) A&E TV Series
 Nameless Moment (2006)
 "Beyond the Felt" (2005) doc TV Series (UK)
 The Select Fit (2004)
 Cigarette (2003)
 E! (2002)

Writer
 Treatment (2010) (story) 20th Century Fox 
 10,000 Virgins (2008) co-writer Ron Fernandez, producer Craig Detweiler.
 The Select Fit (2004)
 Cigarette (2003)
 American Wet Dream (2001)
 When Goldfish Weep (2002)

Actor
 The Select Fit (2004) .... Tomboy

References
 Awaken.org
 The Select Fit on YouTube
 CDFreedom.com
 Dabble.com

External links
 

American male actors
American film directors
American male screenwriters
1980 births
Living people